MV Baltic Ace was a Bahamian-flagged car carrier, that sank in the North Sea on 5 December 2012 after a collision with the Cyprus-registered container ship Corvus J. Built by Stocznia Gdynia in Poland, the ship had been in service since 2007.

Description 

Baltic Ace was a car carrier, a roll-on/roll-off ship designed to transport vehicles in a large, fully enclosed garage-like superstructure running the entire length and width of the vessel. Her car capacity, measured in RT43 units, was 2,132. For loading and unloading cargo, Baltic Ace had a stern ramp for normal ro-ro (roll-on/roll-off) berths and a stern quarter ramp for harbours with no specialized cargo handling facilities.

Fully laden, she drew  of water and had a deadweight tonnage of 7,787 tons. Like most ships of her kind, she was propelled by a single  nickel-aluminum alloy fixed pitch propeller directly coupled to the main engine.

She had three 7-cylinder MAN-B&W Holeby 7L23/30 auxiliary engines for onboard electricity generation, each with an output of 1,120kW. For manoeuvering at ports, she had a 1,000kW transverse bow thruster and another 660kW thruster in the stern, both manufactured by ABB.

Calling ports in the Baltic Sea regularly, Baltic Ace was strengthened for navigation in ice and held a Finnish-Swedish ice class 1A. She was classed by Det Norske Veritas.

Career 
Baltic Ace was of a standard design offered by Stocznia Gdynia, the fifth of six relatively small car carriers built in 2005–2007. Her sister ships are Elbe Highway, Thames Highway, Danube Highway, Seine Highway and Nordic Ace.

The contract for the construction of the vessel was signed on 23 December 2005 and she was laid down at Stocznia Gdynia in Poland on 26 February 2007. Launched on 3 June 2007, Baltic Ace was delivered to her owners on 11 July 2007.

The vessel was under long time charter with Euro Marine Logistics, on a regular loop service calling Europe north continent and Baltic ports.

Sinking 
On 5 December 2012, Baltic Ace collided with the Cyprus-registered container ship Corvus J in the North Sea while underway from Zeebrugge, Belgium, to Kotka, Finland with a cargo of about 1,400 Mitsubishi cars likely headed to the Russian market. According to a representative of the shipping company, the cause of the accident was likely a human error.

After the collision, Baltic Ace began taking on water, capsized and sank within 15 minutes in shallow waters. Corvus J was severely damaged and her bulbous bow was bent, but she was not in danger of sinking and participated in the search for survivors.

The weather conditions, three-metre waves and snow, made the rescue operation difficult. As the search for survivors resumed on the following day, five members of the 24-person crew had been confirmed dead and six were still missing. Thirteen crew members, including the ship's Polish captain, were winched to safety from liferafts by helicopters or picked up by nearby ships. According to Netherlands Coast Guard, the chance of finding more survivors was "virtually zero" and the search for the missing crew members, who might have been trapped inside the wreck, was called off on the day following the accident.

The number of casualties was at last confirmed, when 11 Crew members were reported as dead.

After the sinking, a number of news reports featured a photograph of a sunken vessel incorrectly identified as Baltic Ace. The similarly-coloured wreck, visible through the surface in shallow water, was in fact Asia Malaysia, a Philippine ferry that sank in 2011.

Salvage operation 

In March 2014, Rijkswaterstaat awarded contract for the complete removal of the sunken car carrier to the Dutch company Royal Boskalis Westminster and its partner Mammoet. Once all remaining oil had been removed from the wreck, the vessel was cut into 8 separate pieces using a cutting wire and raised from the seabed. The same method was previously used in the salvage of MV Tricolor, a car carrier that sank in the English Channel in 2002, and to remove the bow of the Russian submarine Kursk before the rest of the hull was raised.

The recovery of the wreck was completed in September 2015.

See also 
 Tricolor, car carrier that sank in December 2002
 List of roll-on/roll-off vessel accidents

References 

2007 ships
Maritime incidents in 2012
Shipwrecks in the North Sea
Ships built in Gdynia
Ro-ro ships
Merchant ships of the Bahamas
December 2012 events in Europe